Mühlenbach is a quarter in north-western Luxembourg City, in southern Luxembourg.

, the quarter has a population of 2,201 inhabitants.

References

Quarters of Luxembourg City